Naan Vanangum Deivam is a 1963 Indian Tamil language film, directed by K. Somu and produced by C. T. Chettiar. The film stars Sivaji Ganesan, Padmini, T. R. Ramachandran and V. Nagayya. It is based on the English novel Frankenstein, written by Mary Shelley.

Plot

Cast 
Sivaji Ganesan as Sundaram
Padmini as Rukmani
T. R. Ramachandran as Gopal
Ragini as Kalaivani
K. Sarangapani
Nagesh
V. Nagayya
M. R. Santhanam
P. D. Sambatham
S. Ramarao
C.I.D.Sakunthala (Natya mahal Building Donation Collector)

Soundtrack 
The music was composed by K. V. Mahadevan, while lyrics were written by A. Maruthakasi & K. S. Gopalakrishnan. The song "Mullaippoo Manakkudu" was initially meant to be picturised on Ganesan, but after distributors objected, it was instead used for Chandrababu.

References

External links 
 

1960s Tamil-language films
1963 films
Films based on horror novels
Films scored by K. V. Mahadevan
Frankenstein films
Films directed by K. Somu